Harold Edwin Darke (29 October 1888 – 28 November 1976) was an English composer and organist. He is particularly known for his choral compositions, which are an established part of the respertoire of Anglican church music.  Darke had a fifty-year association with the church of St Michael, Cornhill, in the City of London.

Early life
Darke was born in Highbury, London, the youngest son of Samuel Darke and Arundel Bourne. He and attended Dame Alice Owen's School in Islington, and studied organ with Walter Parratt in Oxford and composition with Charles Villiers Stanford at the Royal College of Music. He served in the Royal Air Force during World War I. During his RAF service he married Dora Garland, at St Michaels Church, Cornhill, on 25 July 1918. Dora was a violinist and was the first woman to lead the Queen's Hall Orchestra.

Career

His first organist post was at Emmanuel Church, West Hampstead from 1906 to 1911. He became organist at St Michael Cornhill in 1916, and stayed there until 1966, leaving only briefly in 1941 to deputise for Boris Ord as Director of Music at King's College, Cambridge during World War II.

It is widely accepted that the Cornhill Lunchtime Organ Recitals series begun by Darke in 1916 is the longest-running lunchtime organ concert series in the world. His midday recitals each Monday,  playing Bach in the legato style of Schweitzer, made him a City institution.<ref name=grove>Webb, Stanley. 'Darke, Harold (Edwin)', in Grove Music Online (2001)</ref> The series has flourished under his successors Richard Popplewell 1966–1979 and the present organist, Jonathan Rennert, from 1979. Darke also served as professor for organ at the Royal College of Music from 1919 to 1969.

Darke's work as Conductor of St Michael's Singers was crowned in 1956 (on the occasion of the Choir's 40th Anniversary) with first performances of a number of now well-established works composed especially for the occasion – notably An English Mass by Herbert Howells, Hierusalem by George Dyson, and A Vision of Aeroplanes by Ralph Vaughan Williams.

 Later life 
Darke continued to be active in his later years. He recorded Elgar’s Organ Sonata in his early 70s and gave recitals at the Royal Festival Hall to mark his 75th, 80th and 85th birthdays. He died in Cambridge, UK, aged 88 on 28 November 1976.

Compositions

His famous 1909 setting of Christina Rossetti's "In the Bleak Midwinter" is often sung at the service of Nine Lessons and Carols at King's College, Cambridge, and at similar services around the world.

In a poll of choral experts and choirmasters that was published in BBC Music Magazine on 7 December 2008, "In the Bleak Midwinter" was voted the greatest Christmas carol of all time. Comparing Darke's setting to another popular setting by Gustav Holst, Deputy Editor Jeremy Pound expressed the view that "While Gustav Holst's charming setting of 1909 is rightly loved by millions worldwide, it is the less well known but infinitely more stylish setting by Harold Darke from two years later that convincingly won the day in our poll."

Most of Darke's other compositions that are still performed are settings of the Anglican liturgy, especially his three Communion Services in E minor, F, and A minor; and his Magnificat and Nunc Dimittis in F. The short cantata As the Leaves Fall, (1917), setting words by the soldier poet Joseph Courtney (1891-1973), has been recorded by the Guildford Cathedral Choir, along with a later cantata, The Kingdom of God (1921), setting Francis Thompson.

Organ
Suite in D minor: Prelude, Pastorale, Toccata
Prelude and Fugue on "Heinlein"
Rhapsody in E, Op. 4
Prelude on "Windsor"
Prelude in Memory of ParryThree Hymn Preludes, Op. 20: St. Peter, Darwall's 148th, On a Theme of Tallis
Fantasy in E, Op. 39Meditation on Brother James' AirRetrospectionBridal ProcessionChoir
 As the Leaves Fall, Op. 26 (1917), soprano solo, SATB choir and orchestraIn the Bleak MidwinterCommunion Service in E minorCommunion Service in FCommunion Service in A minorEvening Service in FHarvest Cantata "The Sower" for Solo Quartet, Choir and Organ. Published (1929) by OUP
Jubilate for chorus & organ in F major
 The Kingdom of God, Op. 31 (1921), soprano solo, SATB choir and orchestra
O Brother Man
O gladsome light, Op. 38 No 2 (1929)
Psalm 10
Te Deum for chorus & organ in F major

References

External links
Brief biography
Brief biography
The Music at St Michael's Cornhill

: a 1968 performance by Guildford Cathedral Choir, directed by Barry Rose
Recording of Darke's In the bleak midwinter from Coro Nostro, a mixed chamber choir based in Leicester, UK.

1888 births
1976 deaths
20th-century organists
20th-century British male musicians
British male organists
Classical composers of church music
English classical composers
English classical organists
English choral conductors
English male classical composers
People from Highbury
Male classical organists
Royal Air Force personnel of World War I